A geolocation-based video game or location-based video game is a type of video game where the gameplay evolves and progresses via a player's location in the world, often attained using GPS. Most location-based video games are mobile games that make use of the mobile phone's built in GPS capability. One of the most recognizable location-based mobile games is Pokémon Go.

Location-based games often have real-world map integration.

Location-based (GPS) games are often conflated with augmented reality (AR) games. GPS and AR are two separate technologies which are sometimes both used in a game, like in Pokémon Go and Minecraft Earth. GPS and AR functionality largely do not depend on one another but are often used in concert. A video game may be an AR game, a location-based game, both, or neither.

Technology
Geolocation-based video games use GPS.

Games such as Pokémon Go and Ingress also use an Image Linked Map(ILM) interface, where approved geotagged locations appear on a stylized map for the user to interact with.

Legality
The nature of location-based gaming may mean that certain real-world locations will be visited by higher-than-normal numbers of people who are playing the game, which generally has been received favorably by nearby attractions or local businesses. However, these games may generate activity at locations that are privately-owned or have access limits, or otherwise cause undesirable congestion.

Pokémon Go notably has several publicized events of players being drawn to inappropriate locations for the game, requiring the developer to manually remove these areas from the game. In one of the first legal challenges for location-based gaming, a Federal District court ruled that a Wisconsin county ordinance to require game developers of such location-based games to get appropriate permits to allow locations in the county's public park systems was likely unconstitutional. While the county had felt there was no First Amendment rights involved due to how locations were generated in-game, the Federal judge disagreed.

The interaction of location-bound augmented reality with property law is largely undefined. Several models have been analysed for how this interaction may be resolved in a common law context: an extension of real property rights to also cover augmentations on or near the property with a strong notion of trespassing, forbidding augmentations unless allowed by the owner; an 'open range' system, where augmentations are allowed unless forbidden by the owner; and a 'freedom to roam' system, where real property owners have no control over non-disruptive augmentations.

One issue experienced during the Pokémon Go craze was the game's players disturbing owners of private property while visiting nearby location-bound augmentations, which may have been on the properties or the properties may have been en route. The terms of service of Pokémon Go explicitly disclaim responsibility for players' actions, which may limit (but may not totally extinguish) the liability of its producer, Niantic, in the event of a player trespassing while playing the game: by Niantic's argument, the player is the one committing the trespass, while Niantic has merely engaged in permissible free speech. A theory advanced in lawsuits brought against Niantic is that their placement of game elements in places that will lead to trespass or an exceptionally large flux of visitors can constitute nuisance, despite each individual trespass or visit only being tenuously caused by Niantic.

Another claim raised against Niantic is that the placement of profitable game elements on land without permission of the land's owners is unjust enrichment. More hypothetically, a property may be augmented with advertising or disagreeable content against its owner's wishes. Under American law, these situations are unlikely to be seen as a violation of real property rights by courts without an expansion of those rights to include augmented reality (similarly to how English common law came to recognise air rights).

Some attempts at legislative regulation have been made in the United States. Milwaukee County, Wisconsin attempted to regulate augmented reality games played in its parks, requiring prior issuance of a permit, but this was criticised on free speech grounds by a federal judge; and Illinois considered mandating a notice and take down procedure for location-bound augmentations.

Concerns
In a paper titled "Death by Pokémon GO", researchers at Purdue University's Krannert School of Management claim the game caused "a disproportionate increase in vehicular crashes and associated vehicular damage, personal injuries, and fatalities in the vicinity of locations, called PokéStops, where users can play the game while driving." Using data from one municipality, the paper extrapolates what that might mean nationwide and concluded "the increase in crashes attributable to the introduction of Pokémon GO is 145,632 with an associated increase in the number of injuries of 29,370 and an associated increase in the number of fatalities of 256 over the period of 6 July 2016, through 30 November 2016." The authors extrapolated the cost of those crashes and fatalities at between $2bn and $7.3 billion for the same period.

Notable examples 

 Pokémon Go
 Harry Potter: Wizards Unite (discontinued)
 Ingress
 Geocaching
 BotFighters
 Dragon Quest Walk 
 Shadow Cities (discontinued)
 Maguss (discontinued)
 Minecraft Earth (discontinued)
 Cluetivity

See also 
 Transreality gaming

References

Game terminology
Pervasive games